You Are What You may refer to:

You Are What You Eat, a dieting TV programme aired on British broadcasting company Channel 4, and presented by Gillian McKeith
You Are What You Eat (film), 1968 American counterculture semi-documentary movie by Barry Feinstein
You Are What You Eat (disambiguation), other uses of the term
You Are What You Is, 1981 double album in 1981, later a 20-song CD both by Frank Zappa
"You Are What You Is" (song), title song from above album
"You Are What You Love", single by Jenny Lewis and The Watson Twins from the 2006 album Rabbit Fur Coat
You Are What You Love (album), album by Canadian singer-songwriter Melanie Doane